Greg Wells is a multiple Grammy winning Canadian musician, record producer, songwriter and audio engineer. Wells has songs on over 130 million albums sold. He has worked with Adele, Lin-Manuel Miranda, Ariana Grande, Michael Bublé, The Greatest Showman: Original Motion Picture Soundtrack, Ryan Tedder, Dua Lipa, John Legend, Kid Cudi, Jazmine Sullivan, Rufus Wainwright, Taylor Swift, Missy Elliot, Weezer, Katy Perry, OneRepublic, Jake Wesley Rogers, "San Quentin Mixtapes, Vol. 1" with David Jassy, Pharrell Williams, Carrie Underwood, Deftones, Jamie Cullum, Pink,  Theophilus London, Keith Urban, Crash Test Dummies, Celine Dion, MIKA, Twenty One Pilots, Aerosmith, as well as Sir George Martin, Quincy Jones, Elton John, Burt Bacharach, Stephen Schwartz, Andrew Lloyd Webber, and the Count Basie Orchestra. 

A classically trained multi-instrumentalist, Wells is featured as a drummer in Modern Drummer, as a pianist in Keyboard, as a synth programmer in Electronic Musician, as a songwriter in American Songwriter and Billboard, and as a producer, mix engineer, and music maker on the cover of Mix with Ryan Tedder in the May 2017 edition.

Awards 
Wells received the Pensado Giant Award at the 2017 Pensado Awards for achievements in the field of record-making. He has been nominated for a Grammy six times, won a Grammy in 2019 for his production and mixing on The Greatest Showman film and soundtrack album, and in 2023 won a 2nd Grammy for Michael Buble's album Higher. In June 2015, Wells was awarded an honorary degree from his alma mater Humber College, a music school in Toronto.  Wells was nominated as producer of the year in 2000 and 2019 at the Canadian Juno Awards.

|-
! scope="row" | 2008
| "Love Today"
| Grammy Award for Best Dance Recording
| 
|-
! scope="row" | 2011
| Teenage Dream
| Grammy Award for Album of the Year
| 
|-
! scope="row" | 2019
| The Greatest Showman: Original Motion Picture Soundtrack
| Grammy Award for Best Compilation Soundtrack for Visual Media
| 
|-
! scope="row" | 2022
| In The Heights: Original Motion Picture Soundtrack
| Grammy Award for Best Compilation Soundtrack for Visual Media
| 
|-
! scope="row" | 2022
| Andrew Lloyd Webber’s Cinderella
| Grammy Award for Best Musical Theater Album
| 
|-
! scope="row" | 2023
| Michael Bublé: Higher
| Grammy Award for Best Traditional Pop Vocal Album
|

Early life 
Wells grew up in the town of Peterborough, Ontario, Canada, the son of United Church of Canada minister Dr. Reverend Bill Wells. At age 11, he was in a wheelchair unable to walk for two years with Perthes' disease. Wells attended Adam Scott CVI, learned to play several instruments, and joined many musical ensembles in his hometown from the local orchestra to bar bands to being a church organist/choir director, as well as DJing dances and presenting a weekly radio show on Trent University Radio CFFF-FM. He studied classical piano, drums, pipe organ, orchestral percussion and music theory at Toronto's Royal Conservatory of Music.  At age 15, Wells was awarded the top prize out of all categories in the Peterborough Kiwanis Music Festival, the Founders Award, and represented Peterborough twice at the Kiwanis Music Provincial Finals for the province of Ontario. At age 17, he attended the Humber College Jazz Music Program in Toronto as a piano major.

Career 

After moving from Peterborough to Toronto at age 17, Wells worked as a live and studio musician with Canadian musicians Rob McConnell and Kim Mitchell. He joined Kim Mitchell's band at age 19. Wells recorded keyboards and backing vocals on Mitchell's Rockland, toured Canada several times with the band, and won the award for Best Keyboardist at the 1990 Toronto Music Awards.

Wells was awarded a Canada Council arts grant to study in California with Clare Fischer, composer and string arranger for Prince. He traveled to Los Angeles at age 21 with the intention of returning to Canada, but Fischer began recommending Wells as a pianist. Wells joined k.d. lang's band soon afterward, performing with her on the 1993 Grammy Awards where she won Best Pop Female Vocal.

His first recorded song as a songwriter was with Aerosmith on the double platinum Nine Lives, followed by "The Reason" on Celine Dion's 31 million selling album, Let's Talk About Love. DreamWorks executive Lenny Waronker tapped Wells in 2001 to produce Rufus Wainwright. Songwriter Kara DioGuardi started collaborating with Wells in 2003. Wells then produced, mixed and played most of the instruments on Mika's 6 million selling #1 debut album Life In Cartoon Motion.

In 2007, Wells produced both Timbaland's and OneRepublic's version of the song, "Apologize". The song ranked number 50 on the list of the Billboard Hot 100's All-Time Top Songs list from the chart's first 50 years. It stayed at number one for eight consecutive weeks on the Billboard Pop 100 chart, and spent 25 consecutive weeks in the top 10. It was ranked number 10 on the Billboard Hot 100 Songs of the Decade.

The biggest selling worldwide album of 2018 The Greatest Showman: Original Motion Picture Soundtrack was produced and mixed by Wells.

Wells has designed best selling music software, creating the "El Rey" compressor plugin with Acustica Audio and Studio DMI, and a signature series of plugins with Waves Audio.

Wells, Ryan Tedder and Nina Woodford co-wrote (with Wells producing and mixing) the 2019 Special Olympics theme song "Right Where I'm Supposed To Be", executive produced by Quincy Jones. The song was performed by Ryan Tedder, Avril Lavigne, Luis Fonsi, Hussain Al Jassmi, Assala Nasri and Tamer Hosny live at the opening ceremonies in Abu Dhabi.

Wells produced the Grammy and Golden Globe nominated song "Beautiful Ghosts" performed by Taylor Swift for the 2019 film Cats, an adaptation of the 1981 musical of the same name. The song is co-produced with Cats creator Andrew Lloyd Webber, and written by Taylor Swift and Lloyd Webber.

Wells received a Grammy nomination for co-producing and mixing all songs for Lin-Manuel Miranda's 2021 movie and soundtrack album In the Heights, directed by Jon M. Chu.  Wells worked on a second film with Alex Lacamoire and Miranda, the animated hit movie musical Vivo (film) directed by Kirk DeMicco.  Wells also worked on a third film for Lin-Manuel Miranda's directorial debut, mixing the songs in the musical film Tick, Tick... Boom!.

Personal life 
Wells is married to Swedish songwriter Nina Woodford. He has six children. He works out of his studio in Los Angeles.

Credits 
In The Heights – received 5th Grammy nomination for mixing songs for the film and co-producing the soundtrack album with Lin-Manuel Miranda, Alex Lacamoire, and Bill Sherman.
John Legend – Wells mixed, performed piano, co-wrote and co-produced the song "Never Break" from the album Bigger Love, which won Best R&B Album at the 63rd Grammy Awards.
Adele – "One and Only" on Adele's 21, the best-selling album of the 21st century, and one of the best-selling albums of all time.
The Greatest Showman: Original Motion Picture Soundtrack – Wells won a 2019 Grammy Award for producing and mixing this number 1 album on iTunes in 77 countries, number 1 in the UK album sales chart for 28 weeks, number 1 in the US album sales chart for three weeks, with the single "This Is Me" winning a 2018 Golden Globe and nominated/performed on the 2018 Academy Awards.  The album was the biggest selling album of 2018 worldwide.
Twenty One Pilots – produced and mixed 2× Platinum album Vessel.
Taylor Swift – produced the Golden Globe and Grammy nominated song "Beautiful Ghosts".
Timbaland and OneRepublic – produced worldwide number 1 hit "Apologize", both the Timbaland remix released first and the OneRepublic original version.
Mika – produced, mixed, and played electric guitar, drums, piano and bass guitar on Mika's chart-topping debut single "Grace Kelly" from the album Life in Cartoon Motion which stayed at number 1 for seven weeks in the UK.
 Celine Dion 31 million selling album Let's Talk About Love, cowrote #1 European single "The Reason" (Celine Dion song)

References

External links 
 Wells interviewed in Variety July 2018
 Wells interviewed in The Advocate August 2018
 Wells interviewed by Grammys June 2018
 Wells interviewed in Electronic Musician Magazine, Dec 2011
 Wells interviewed in American Songwriter, Nov 2011
 Wells interviewed in NY Times article

Living people
Canadian songwriters
Canadian record producers
Grammy Award winners
Humber College alumni
Musicians from Peterborough, Ontario
21st-century Canadian male musicians
Year of birth missing (living people)